Heym is a surname. Notable people with the surname include:

 Georg Heym (1887–1912), German author
 Stefan Heym (1913–2001), German author

See also
 Heym (gun manufacturer)
 Chayyim, the basis for this name
 Haim (disambiguation)
 Heim (surname)